"Cross Me" is a song by English singer-songwriter Ed Sheeran featuring American rappers Chance the Rapper and PnB Rock. It released on 24 May 2019 through Atlantic Records as the second single from the former's compilation album, No.6 Collaborations Project (2019).

Background and promotion
Ed Sheeran revealed the song name on 20 May 2019, crossing out the two featured artists name, challenging fans to guess who they were. He hinted at the featured artists by wearing a Chance the Rapper hat and a PnB Rock backpack. He also gave a clue of the release date by stating that he had "more new stuff" coming soon.

PnB Rock's vocals are included via sampling of his song "Pressure" from the album Catch These Vibes, specifically from the audiotape of a 2017 XXL video in which he gave a freestyled performance of "Pressure". A music video focusing on the lyrics was released on 21 June 2019.

Credits and personnel
Credits adapted from Tidal.
 Ed Sheeran – lead vocals, writer 
 Chance the Rapper – featured vocals, writer 
 PnB Rock – featured vocals, writer
 Fred Gibson – backing vocals, producer, writer, programming, keyboards, guitar, bass, drums, engineering
 PARISI – synthesizers, designing
 Gabe Jaskowiak – recording
 Manny Marroquin – mixing
 Chris Galland – mix engineering
 Robin Florent – assistant mix engineering
 Scott Desmarais – assistant mix engineering

Charts

Weekly charts

Year-end charts

Certifications

Release history

References

External links

2019 singles
2019 songs
Ed Sheeran songs
Chance the Rapper songs
PnB Rock songs
Songs written by Ed Sheeran
Songs written by Chance the Rapper
Songs written by Fred Again
Songs written by PnB Rock
Song recordings produced by Fred Again

Alternative R&B songs